A list of environmental philosophers, ordered alphabetically, which includes living or recently deceased individuals who have published in the field of environmental ethics/philosophy (most of whom have PhDs in Philosophy, and are employed as philosophy professors), and those who are commonly regarded as precursors to the field.

Environmental philosophy has been impacted by individuals with a range of backgrounds, reminiscent of the approach of the natural philosophy, natural religion, and natural history traditions.

David Abram
Glenn Albrecht
Robin Attfield
Jane Bennett
Thomas Berry
Murray Bookchin
J. Baird Callicott, University of North Texas
Alan Carter, University of Glasgow
Stephen R. L. Clark, University of Liverpool
Kathleen Dean Moore
Jan Deckers, Newcastle University
Paul R. Ehrlich
Robert Frodeman, University of North Texas
Brian Goodwin
Ben Hale, University of Colorado–Boulder
Donna Haraway
James Hatley, Salisbury University
Serenella Iovino
Erazim Kohák
Gilbert LaFreniere
Aldo Leopold
James Lovelock
Alan Marshall, Mahidol University
Freya Mathews, La Trobe University
Humberto Maturana
Carolyn Merchant
Mary Midgley
Seyyed Hossein Nasr
Arne Næss
Michael P. Nelson, Michigan State University
Max Oelschlaeger
John O'Neill, University of Manchester
David W. Orr, Oberlin College
Konrad Ott, University of Kiel
John Passmore
Val Plumwood
Tom Regan, North Carolina State University
John Rodman, Claremont College
Holmes Rolston III, Colorado State University
Ricardo Rozzi, University of North Texas and  Omora Ethnobotanical Park (Universidad de Magallanes & IEB, Chile)
Jeffrey Sachs
Sahotra Sarkar
David Schmidtz
Albert Schweitzer
Paul Shepard, Claremont McKenna College
Peter Singer, Princeton University
David Skrbina, University of Michigan, Dearborn
Richard Sylvan (originally published as Richard Routley)
Bron Taylor, University of Florida
Paul W. Taylor
Paul B. Thompson
Francisco Varela
Karen J. Warren, Macalester College
Anthony Weston
David Wood, Vanderbilt University
Michael Zimmerman, University of Colorado

See also
Ecofeminism
Environmental ethics
Environmental philosophy
List of philosophers
Natural philosophy

References 

Environmental